Aren may refer to:

People

Given name
 Andreas Arén (born 1985), Swedish ski jumper
 Aren b, also known as Brendan Vintedge, American singer-songwriter
 Aren Davoudi (born 1986), Armenian basketball player
 Aren Kuri (born 1991), Japanese baseball player
 Aren Maeir (born 1958), American-born Israeli archaeologist and professor at Bar Ilan University
 Aren Nielsen (born 1968), American competitive figure skater
 Aren X. Tulchinsky, Canadian novelist

Surname
 Sadun Aren (1922–2008), Turkish academic and politician
 Väino Aren (born 1933), Estonian ballet dancer and actor

Places
 Aren, Pyrénées-Atlantiques, Nouvelle-Aquitaine, France
 Aren, also known as Pondok Aren, Indonesia
 Aren-e Sofla, Kerman Province, Iran
 Arén, Spain